The GR 132 is a long-distance walking route in La Gomera, Canary Islands, Spain. It's part of the extensive GR footpath network of paths, tracks and trails. It's a well marked loop with a starting point in San Sebastián de La Gomera, the island's capital city. GR 132 is about 120-130 kilometres long, depending on the trail's variation.

External links

 Camino Natural Costas de La Gomera
 Actual map (from 2017)
 Guide for hiking GR 132 in La Gomera

Hiking trails in Spain
La Gomera